Condensation  may refer to:
 Condensation, the change in matter of a substance to a denser phase
 DNA condensation, the process of compacting DNA molecules
 Cloud condensation nuclei, airborne particles required for cloud formation
 Condensation (aerosol dynamics), a phase transition from gas to liquid
 Condensation cloud, observable at large explosions in humid air
 Condensation reaction, in chemistry, a chemical reaction between two molecules or moieties
 Condensation algorithm, in computer science, a computer vision algorithm
 Condensation (graph theory), in mathematics, a directed acyclic graph formed by contracting the strongly connected components of another graph
 Dodgson condensation, in mathematics, a method invented by Lewis Carroll for computing the determinants of square matrices
 Bose–Einstein condensation, a state of matter of a dilute gas in which quantum effects become apparent on a macroscopic scale
 Condensation (psychology)

Condensed may refer to:
 Condensed font, a typeface drawn narrower than normal width
 Condensed milk, milk with water removed

See also